The  Edmonton Eskimos finished 2nd in the West Division with a 9–9 record winning the tie-breaker with the Saskatchewan Roughriders, who also finished 9–9–0, and denying them a home playoff date. The Roughriders defeated the Eskimos in the West Semi-Final, ending their season and a chance to defend their Grey Cup title.

Offseason

CFL Draft

Preseason

Schedule

Regular season

Season standings

Season schedule

Total attendance: 351,284 
Average attendance: 39,031 (65.0%)

Playoffs

West Semi-Final

Awards and records

All-Star selections

References

Edmonton Eskimos
Edmonton Elks seasons